The 2018 National Football League (also known as the Aminovital National Football League) is the 44th season of the National Football League.

Division 1 League table

Division 2 League table

References

External links
 Football Association of Singapore website

Football competitions in Singapore
Singapore National Football League
1